Rudolf Knijnenburg Cordero (born May 18, 1982 in Santa Cruz de la Sierra) is a Bolivian sport shooter. He represented his nation Bolivia in pistol shooting at the 2004 Summer Olympics and in four editions of the Pan American Games (2003, 2007, 2011, and 2015).

Knijnenburg qualified as a lone shooter for the Bolivian squad in the men's 10 m air pistol at the 2004 Summer Olympics in Athens after having accepted an invitational berth for his country from the International Shooting Sport Federation with a minimum score of 570. He rounded off the field of forty-seven shooters with the lowest overall score in the prelims, firing at 548 points.

Despite missing out his 2008 and 2012 Olympic bid, Knijnenburg's most remarkable feat came at the 2011 Pan American Games in Guadalajara, where he finished seventh in the air pistol final with a total of 669.7 points.

References

External links
 

1982 births
Living people
Sportspeople from Santa Cruz de la Sierra
Bolivian male sport shooters
Bolivian people of Dutch descent
Olympic shooters of Bolivia
Shooters at the 2004 Summer Olympics
Shooters at the 2007 Pan American Games
Shooters at the 2011 Pan American Games
Shooters at the 2015 Pan American Games
Shooters at the 2016 Summer Olympics
Pan American Games competitors for Bolivia
South American Games bronze medalists for Bolivia
South American Games medalists in shooting
Competitors at the 2014 South American Games
Shooters at the 2019 Pan American Games